Percy Harrison Fawcett  (18 August 1867  disappeared 1925) was a British geographer, artillery officer, cartographer, archaeologist, and explorer of South America. Fawcett disappeared in 1925 (along with his eldest son, Jack, and one of Jack's friends, Raleigh Rimell) during an expedition to find an ancient lost city which he and others believed existed in the jungles of Brazil.

Life

Early life
Percy Fawcett was born on 18 August 1867 in Torquay, Devon, England, to Edward Boyd Fawcett and Myra Elizabeth (née MacDougall). Fawcett received his early education at Newton Abbot Proprietary College, alongside the sportsman and journalist Bertram Fletcher Robinson. Fawcett's father, who had been born in India, was a Fellow of the Royal Geographical Society (RGS), while his elder brother, Edward Douglas Fawcett (1866–1960), was a mountain climber, an Eastern occultist, and the author of philosophical books and popular adventure novels.

Fawcett attended the Royal Military Academy, Woolwich as a cadet, and was commissioned as a lieutenant of the Royal Artillery on 24 July 1886. This same year, Fawcett met his future wife, Nina Agnes Paterson, whom he married in 1901 and had two sons, Jack (1903–1925?) and Brian (1906–1984), and one daughter, Joan (1910–2005). On 13 January 1896, he was appointed adjutant of the 1st Cornwall (Duke of Cornwall's) Artillery Volunteers, and was promoted to captain on 15 June 1897. He later served in Hong Kong, Malta, and Trincomalee, Ceylon.

Fawcett joined the RGS in 1901, in order to study surveying and mapmaking. Later, he worked for the British Secret Service in North Africa while pursuing the surveyor's craft. He served for the War Office on Spike Island in County Cork from 1903 to 1906, where he was promoted to major on 11 January 1905. He became friends with authors Sir Henry Rider Haggard and Sir Arthur Conan Doyle; the latter used Fawcett's Amazonian field reports as inspiration for his novel The Lost World.

Early expeditions
Fawcett's first expedition to South America was in 1906 (he was seconded for service there on 2 May) when at the age of 39 he travelled to Brazil to map a jungle area at the border of Brazil and Bolivia at the behest of the Royal Geographical Society. The Society had been commissioned to map the area as a third party unbiased by local national interests. He arrived in La Paz, Bolivia, in June. He reported other mysterious animals unknown to zoology, such as a small cat-like dog about the size of a foxhound, which he claimed to have seen twice, and the giant Apazauca spider, which was said to have poisoned a number of locals.

Fawcett made seven expeditions between 1906 and 1924. He was mostly amicable with the locals through gifts, patience, and courteous behaviour. In 1908, he traced the source of the Rio Verde (Brazil) and in 1910 made a journey to Heath River (on the border between Peru and Bolivia) to find its source, having retired from the British army on 19 January. In 1911, Fawcett once again left his home and family to return to the Amazon and chart hundreds of miles of unexplored jungle, accompanied by his trusted, longtime exploring companion, Henry Costin, and biologist and polar explorer James Murray. He also developed a theory that the ruins of an ancient city, which he named “Z,” lay hidden in the jungle.

After a 1913 expedition, he supposedly claimed to have seen dogs with double noses. These may have been double-nosed Andean tiger hounds.

Based on documentary research, Fawcett had by 1914 formulated ideas about a "lost city" he named "Z" (Zed) somewhere in the Mato Grosso region of Brazil. He theorized that a complex civilization once existed in the Amazon region and that isolated ruins may have survived. Fawcett also found a document known as Manuscript 512, written after explorations made in the sertão of the state of Bahia, and housed at the National Library of Rio de Janeiro. It is believed to be by Portuguese bandeirante , who wrote that in 1753 he had discovered the ruins of an ancient city that contained arches, a statue, and a temple with hieroglyphics; the city is described in great detail without providing a specific location. This city became a secondary destination for Fawcett, after "Z". (See Fawcett's own book Exploration Fawcett.)

At the beginning of the First World War Fawcett returned to Britain to serve with the Army as a Reserve Officer in the Royal Artillery, volunteering for duty in Flanders, and commanding an artillery brigade despite being nearly 50 years old. He was promoted from major to lieutenant-colonel on 1 March 1918, and received three mentions in despatches from Field Marshal Sir Douglas Haig, in November 1916, November 1917, and November 1918, and was also awarded the Distinguished Service Order in June 1917.

After the war, Fawcett returned to Brazil to study local wildlife and archaeology. In 1920, he made a solo attempt to search for "Z" but ended it after suffering from a fever and shooting his pack animal.

Final expedition

In 1924, with funding from a London-based group of financiers known as 'the Glove', Fawcett returned to Brazil with his eldest son Jack and Jack's best and longtime friend, Raleigh Rimell, for an exploratory expedition to find "Z". Fawcett left instructions stating that if the expedition did not return, no rescue expedition should be sent lest the rescuers suffer his fate.

Fawcett was a man with years of experience traveling and had taken equipment such as canned foods, powdered milk, guns, flares, a sextant, and a chronometer. His travel companions were both chosen for their health, ability, and loyalty to each other; Fawcett chose only two companions in order to travel lighter and with less notice to native tribes, as some were hostile towards outsiders.

On 20 April 1925, his final expedition departed from Cuiabá. In addition to his two principal companions, Fawcett was accompanied by two Brazilian laborers, two horses, eight mules, and a pair of dogs. The last communication from the expedition was on 29 May 1925 when Fawcett wrote, in a letter to his wife delivered by a native runner, that he was ready to go into unexplored territory with only Jack and Raleigh. They were reported to be crossing the Upper Xingu, a southeastern tributary river of the River Amazon. The final letter, from 29 May 1925, written from Dead Horse Camp, gave their location and was generally optimistic.

In January 1927, the Royal Geographical Society declared and accepted the men as lost, close to two years after the party's last message. Soon after the society's declaration, there was an outpouring of volunteers to attempt to locate the lost explorers. Many expeditions attempting to find Fawcett failed. At least one lone searcher died in the attempt.

Many people assumed that local Indians killed them, as several tribes were nearby at the time: the Kalapalos, the last tribe to have seen them, the Arumás, the Suyás, and the Xavantes whose territory they were entering. According to explorer John Hemming, Fawcett's party of three was too few to survive in the jungle and his expectation that his Indian hosts would look after them was likely to have antagonized them by failing to bring any gifts to repay their generosity. Twenty years later, a Kalapalo chief called Comatzi told his people how the unwelcome strangers were killed, but others have thought they got lost and died of starvation, and the bones provided by Comatzi turned out not to be those of Fawcett. Edmar Morel and Nilo Vellozo reported that Comatzi's predecessor, Kalapalos Chief Izarari, had told them he had killed Fawcett and his son Jack, seemingly by shooting them with arrows after Fawcett allegedly attacked him and other Indians when they refused to give him guides and porters to take him to their Chavante enemies, and Rolf Blomberg said Izarari had told him that Raleigh Rimell had already died of fever in a camp of Kurikuro Indians. A somewhat different version came from Orlando Villas-Bôas, who reported that Izarari had told him that he had killed all three white men with his club the morning after Jack Fawcett had allegedly consorted with one of his wives, when he claimed that Percy Fawcett had slapped him in the face after the chief refused his demand for canoes and porters to continue his journey.

The Kalapalo have an oral story of the arrival of three explorers which states that the three went east, and after five days the Kalapalo noticed that the group no longer made campfires. The Kalapalo say that a very violent tribe most likely killed them. However, both of the younger men were lame and ill when last seen, and there is no proof that they were murdered. It is plausible that they died of natural causes in the Brazilian jungle.

In 1927, a nameplate of Fawcett's was found with an Indian tribe. In June 1933, a theodolite compass belonging to Fawcett was found near the Baciary Indians of Mato Grosso by Colonel Aniceto Botelho. However, the nameplate was from Fawcett's expedition five years earlier and had most likely been given as a gift to the chief of that Indian tribe. The compass was proven to have been left behind before he entered the jungle on his final journey.

Dead Horse Camp
Dead Horse Camp, or Fawcett's Camp, is one of the major camps that Fawcett made on his final journey. This encampment was his last known location. From Dead Horse Camp, Fawcett wrote to his wife about the hardships that he and his companions had faced, his coordinates, his doubts in Raleigh Rimell, and Fawcett's plans for the near future. He concludes his message with, "You need have no fear of any failure..."

One question remaining about Dead Horse Camp concerns a discrepancy in the coordinates Fawcett gave for the camp. In the letter to his wife, he wrote: "Here we are at Dead Horse Camp, latitude 11 degrees 43' South and longitude 54 degrees 35' West, the spot where my horse died in 1920". The discrepancy may have been a typographical error. However, he may have intentionally concealed the location to prevent others from using his notes to find the lost city. It may have also been an attempt to dissuade any rescue attempts; Fawcett had stated that if he disappeared, no rescue party should be sent because the danger was too great.

Posthumous controversy and speculations

Henry Costin's opinion
Explorer Henry Costin accompanied Fawcett on five of his previous expeditions. Costin expressed his doubt that Fawcett would have perished at the hands of native Indians, as he typically enjoyed good relations with them. He believed that Fawcett had succumbed to either a lack of food or exhaustion.

Rumours and unverified reports
During the ensuing decades, various groups mounted several rescue expeditions, without success. They heard only various rumours that could not be verified.

While a fictitious tale estimated that 100 would-be-rescuers died on several expeditions attempting to discover Fawcett's fate, the actual toll was only one—a sole man who ventured after him alone. One of the earliest expeditions was commanded by American explorer George Miller Dyott. In 1927, he claimed to have found evidence of Fawcett's death at the hands of the Aloique Indians, but his story was unconvincing. From 1930 to 1931, Aloha Wanderwell used her seaplane to try to land on the Paraguay River in the state of Mato Grosso to find him. After an emergency landing and living with the Bororo tribe for six weeks, Aloha and her husband Walter flew back to Brazil, with no luck. A 1951 expedition unearthed human bones that were found later to be unrelated to Fawcett or his companions.

Fawcett's alleged bones
In 1951, Orlando Villas-Bôas, activist for indigenous peoples, supposedly received the actual remaining skeletal bones of Fawcett and had them analysed scientifically. The analysis allegedly confirmed the bones were Fawcett's, but his son Brian Fawcett (1906–1984) refused to accept this. Villas-Bôas claimed that Brian was too interested in making money from books about his father's disappearance. Later scientific analysis confirmed that the bones were not Fawcett's. As of 1965, the bones reportedly rested in a box in the flat of one of the Villas-Bôas brothers in São Paulo.

In 1998, English explorer Benedict Allen went to talk to the Kalapalo Indians, said by Villas-Bôas to have confessed to having killed the three Fawcett expedition members. An elder of the Kalapalo, Vajuvi, claimed during a filmed BBC interview with Allen that the bones found by Villas-Bôas 45 years before were not really Fawcett's. Vajuvi also denied that his tribe had any part in the Fawcetts' disappearance. No conclusive evidence supports the latter statement.

Villas-Bôas story
Danish explorer Arne Falk-Rønne journeyed to the Mato Grosso during the 1960s. In a 1991 book, he wrote that he learned of Fawcett's fate from Orlando Villas-Bôas, who had heard it from one of Fawcett's murderers. Allegedly, Fawcett and his companions had a mishap on the river and lost most of the gifts they'd brought along for the Indian tribes. Continuing without gifts was a serious breach of protocol; since the expedition members were all more or less seriously ill at the time, the Kalapalo tribe they encountered decided to kill them. The bodies of Jack Fawcett and Raleigh Rimell were thrown into the river; Colonel Fawcett, considered an old man and therefore distinguished, received a proper burial. Falk-Rønne visited the Kalapalo tribe and reported that one of the tribesmen confirmed Villas-Bôas's story about how and why Fawcett had been killed.

Fawcett's signet ring
In 1979, Fawcett's signet ring was found in a pawnshop. A new theory is that Fawcett and his companions were killed by bandits and the bodies were disposed of in a river while their belongings were despoiled.

Russian documentary
In 2003, a Russian documentary film, The Curse of the Incas' Gold / Expedition of Percy Fawcett to the Amazon, was released as a part of the television series Mysteries of the Century. Among other things, the film emphasizes the recent expedition of Oleg Aliyev to the presumed approximate place of Fawcett's last whereabouts and Aliyev's findings, impressions, and presumptions about Fawcett's fate. The film concludes that Fawcett may have been looking for the ruins of El Dorado, a city built by more advanced people from the other side of the Andes, and that the expedition members were killed by an unknown primitive tribe that had no contact with modern civilization.

Commune in the jungle
On 21 March 2004, The Observer reported that television director Misha Williams, who had studied Fawcett's private papers, believed that Fawcett had not intended to return to Britain but rather meant to found a commune in the jungle, based on theosophical principles and the worship of his son Jack. Williams explained his research in some detail in the preface to his play AmaZonia, first performed in April 2004.

In popular culture 

In Charles MacLean's 1982 novel The Watcher, the protagonist believes himself to be a reincarnation of Percy Fawcett.

In 2005, The New Yorker staff writer David Grann visited the Kalapalo tribe and reported that it had apparently preserved an oral history about Fawcett, among the first Europeans the tribe had ever seen. The oral account said that Fawcett and his party had stayed at their village and then left, heading eastward. The Kalapalos warned Fawcett and his companions that if they went that way they would be killed by the "fierce Indians" who occupied that territory, but Fawcett insisted upon going. The Kalapalos observed smoke from the expedition's campfire each evening for five days before it disappeared. The Kalapalos said they were sure the fierce Indians had killed them. The article also reports that a monumental civilisation known as Kuhikugu may have actually existed near where Fawcett was searching, as discovered recently by archaeologist Michael Heckenberger and others. Grann's findings are further detailed in his book The Lost City of Z (2009).

In 2016, James Gray wrote and directed a film adaptation of Grann's book, with Charlie Hunnam starring as Fawcett.

Episode 133 of British horror podcast The Magnus Archives features a fictional account given by Fawcett describing the events which occurred on his final expedition.

In 2022, Vox released a 6 minute and 54 second long short documentary film onto YouTube as part of their 'Atlas' video series investigating Fawcett's journeys in the Amazon, discussing his mistakes, and the reality of the 'Lost Cities' through modern technology.

Works
Fawcett, Percy and Brian Fawcett (1953), Exploration Fawcett, Phoenix Press (2001 reprint), 
Fawcett, Percy and Brian Fawcett (1953), Lost Trails, Lost Cities, Funk & Wagnalls ASIN B0007DNCV4
Fawcett, Brian (1958), Ruins in the Sky, Hutchinson of London

See also
 List of people who disappeared mysteriously: pre-1970
 :Category:Lost explorers

References

Bibliography
 Falk-Rønne, Arne. (1991). Klodens Forunderlige Mysterier. Roth Forlag.
 Fleming, Peter. (1933) Brazilian Adventure, Charles Scribner's Sons 
 Grann, David (2009) The Lost City of Z: A Tale of Deadly Obsession in the Amazon 
 Leal, Hermes (1996), Enigma do Coronel Fawcett, o verdadeiro Indiana Jones (Colonel Fawcett: The Real-Life Indiana Jones; Published in Portuguese)
 La Gazette des Français du Paraguay, Percy Fawcett - Un monument de l'Exploration et de l'Aventure en Amérique Latine - Expédition du Rio Verde - bilingue français espagnol - numéro 6, Année 1, Asuncion Paraguay.
 Scriblerius, C.S. (2015), "Percyfaw Code, the secret dossier" Published by Amazon.com.

External links
Forgotten Travellers: The Hunt for Colonel Fawcett  Essay on Lt.-Col. Percy Harrison Fawcett
Virtual Exploration Society – Colonel Percy Fawcett
Colonel Fawcett
Mad Dreams in the Amazon Essay on Fawcett from The New York Review of Books
Lost in the Amazon: The Enigma of Col. Percy Fawcett PBS Secrets of the Dead documentary
B. Fletcher Robinson & 'The Lost World' by Paul Spiring
The Lost City of Z is a Long Way From a True Story and I Should Know by John Hemming in The Spectator
 

1867 births
1920s missing person cases
Military personnel from Torquay
English archaeologists
English explorers
Explorers of Amazonia
Lost explorers
Missing person cases in Brazil
Professor Challenger
Royal Artillery officers
Year of death unknown
Companions of the Distinguished Service Order
British Army personnel of World War I